Meng Suping (born 17 July 1989) is a Chinese weightlifter. She competes in the women's super heavyweight category of +75 kg and is an Olympic champion and multiple world medalist.

At the 2012 World University Championships she set a world record in the clean & jerk with a result of 188 kg.

She took first place during the 2016 Olympics in Rio de Janeiro with 130 kg on snatch and 177 kg on clean & jerk, with a combined weight of 307 kg.

Major results

References

External links
 
 
 
 the-sports.org

1989 births
People from Ma'anshan
Weightlifters from Anhui
Olympic weightlifters of China
2016 Olympic gold medalists for China
World Weightlifting Championships medalists
Asian Games medalists in weightlifting
Weightlifters at the 2010 Asian Games
Asian Games silver medalists for China
Living people
Weightlifters at the 2016 Summer Olympics
Olympic medalists in weightlifting
Chinese female weightlifters
Medalists at the 2010 Asian Games
21st-century Chinese women